The 87th Division was a German-trained and reorganized division in the Republic of China's National Revolutionary Army, which was active during the Second Sino-Japanese War. As one of Chiang Kai-shek's elite divisions that received training from German instructors as part of a program of reorganizing the Chinese army, it and its sister 88th Division were regarded as the Chinese Nationalist government's best units. The 87th Division notable for taking part in the Battle of Shanghai in the summer and fall of 1937. Prior to that it had fought in Shanghai against the Japanese during the January 28 Incident in 1932, and following the second engagement in 1937 the division saw action during the Battle of Nanjing and the Burma Campaign. After Japan's surrender, the 87th Division then fought in the Chinese Civil War against the Communists and was dissolved after the conflict.

History
The 87th Division came into existence in the early 1930s as part of a plan formulated by the German military advisors working with Chinese leader Chiang Kai-shek to restructure the National Revolutionary Army into a small core of elite units, with the rest of its troops being placed into local militia units. The 87th Division was one of the small number of units that received training from German instructors before the German government ordered them to return home as part of their alliance with Japan. Regarded along with its sister 88th Division as one of the best units of the Nationalist Army, the troops of the 87th were equipped entirely with the German M1935 Stahlhelm. Not long after its formation the 87th Division took part in the combat against the Japanese in Shanghai during the January 28 Incident in 1932, as part of the 5th Army, and was later stationed in Nanjing. Throughout its existence the 87th Division served as part of the 71st Corps.

Later in 1937 the 87th Division took part in the Battle of Shanghai at the outbreak of the war between the Republic of China and the Empire of Japan. When Zhang Zhizhong, 71st Corps commander, ordered the 87th and 88th—equipped with their German helmets and stick grenades—to move into the city the former used trucks to quickly deploy into downtown Shanghai. It was commanded by Lieutenant General Wang Jingjiu during the battle. On August 14, the unit advanced against the Kung-ta Textile Mill, where the Japanese Special Naval Landing Force troops were based. During the battle it also cooperated with the 88th Division. They jointly advanced against the Imperial Japanese Army forces at the Huishan wharf on August 17, and on the following day the 87th broke through Japanese lines at Yangshupu district, linking up with the 86th Division. It remained engaged in the downtown area before moving out to the west of Shanghai in late October, to the Suzhou Creek. Being as wide as river, it was an obstacle that the Japanese needed to secure to surround Chinese forces in Shanghai in a massive pocket. Despite Japanese shelling and airstrikes the 87th Division managed to fight off multiple attempts to take the position. Upwards of 16,000 members of the division were killed (including replacements for the losses). Subsequently, the unit took part in the Battle of Nanjing, by which point it received Major General Shen Fazao as its new commander. By the time the engagement at Nanjing was over, barely 300 soldiers of the division were still alive, but despite having lost many of its original personnel it still had an elite aura in the eyes of many Chinese commanders.

In May–June 1944 the unit took part, along with its sister 88th Division, in the Burma Campaign, where it saw action along the Burma Road as part of Wei Lihuang's Chinese Expeditionary Force. When their offensive against the Japanese-held town of Lungling failed, the 87th Division commander Major General Zhang Shaoxun almost committed suicide. Around this time it was briefly commanded by Major General Huang Yen before Zhang resumed command in 1945.

After the surrender of Japan in 1945, the 87th Division took part in the Chinese Civil War. During the civil war it notably fought in northeastern China (Manchuria) against the Communists under Lin Biao, in the second and third battles of Siping (1946–47). Reportedly many of the 87th Division troops consisted of new recruits that only had one week's training. The Communists fought the 87th Division at Nong'an in March 1946, and later it fought in defense of the city of Siping with the 54th Division in June, under the command of Chen Mingren. Despite multiple Communist offensives into the city the Nationalist line held, although the brunt of the casualties were taken by the 87th.

Sources

References

Literature
 
 
 
 
 
 
 

Divisions of the National Revolutionary Army
Military units and formations in Burma in World War II